The FIA WTCR Race of France is a round of the World Touring Car Cup which was held at the Circuit Pau-Arnos in 2021 and at the Circuit de Pau-Ville in 2022. It was previously held at the Circuit Paul Ricard and the Circuit de Nevers Magny-Cours.

In 2005 and 2006 it was run at Magny-Cours, before moving to Pau in 2007, when it became the main event in the Pau Grand Prix weekend. However, there was no French round in the 2010 season. After Citroën confirmed their entry into the 2014 season, Citroën Racing team principal Yves Matton suggested a French round would be a good idea. A French round returned to the calendar for 2014, this time held at the Circuit Paul Ricard.

Yvan Muller and Sébastien Loeb are the only French drivers to have won their home race having won in 2014 and 2015 at the Circuit Paul Ricard.

Winners

FIA WTCR Race of Alsace Grand Est

On 14 April 2022, WTCR Race of Alsace Grand Est was added to the calendar instead of the FIA WTCR Race of Russia, which was cancelled due to the ongoing Russian invasion of Ukraine. The race was held on 7 August 2022.

Winners

References

France
France
Auto races in France